North Carolina's 49th House district is one of 120 districts in the North Carolina House of Representatives. It has been represented by Democrat Cynthia Ball since 2017.

Geography
Since 2013, the district has included parts of west central Wake County. The district overlaps with the 15th and 16th Senate districts.

District officeholders

Election results

2022

2020

2018

2016

2014

2012

2010

2008

2006

2004

2002

2000

References

North Carolina House districts
Wake County, North Carolina